El Monstruo is the popular designation given in Chile to the audience attending Viña del Mar International Song Festival. The name is due to the great authority of the audience in each day of the event. From pressing to lengthen presentations favorite artists to interruptions with catcalls to singers and comedians who are not talented or funny, booing to prevent them to complete their show and force them to step off from the stage. In that case, in Chile it is said that "El Monstruo ate the artist".

The audience at  Viña del Mar International Song Festival is the only one in the world that has received a special name. This creates an expectation in people attending the show, waiting for the slightest opportunity to show their intolerance. Most artists booed by El Monstruo have been comedians, both for being unfunny or by the misfortune to get on the stage right between performances of singers or bands of renown.

Sometimes, however, the public has manifested catcalls to protest the presenters of the event. This happened in the 2007 edition, when the hosts, Tonka Tomicic and Sergio Lagos, dismissed the artist Ana Torroja to the crowd surprise, it wanted her to keep singing. The spectators booing to Lagos and Tomicic lasted nearly an hour. The same happened in 2009 when El Monstruo was in favor of Simply Red, booing for an hour for the group to return, and incidentally interrupting the Folk Competition, the singer Paolo Meneguzzi, a humorous routine performed by the trio Manpoval until they partially calmed their minds with the presentation of Rakim and Ken-Y.

A memorable occasion happened when El Monstruo asked the Gaviota de Plata for José Luis Rodríguez in 1988; the refusal of the mayor of Viña del Mar, Eugenia Garrido, who in the 1980s was who corroborated the awards, the singer said: "Sometimes the people's voice must be heard!", a phrase which some thought that had a political background in relation to the military regime that was ruling the country; the artist has said that his sentence was not thought out or had a direct political intention.

The most recent manifestation of this phenomenon was in the edition of 2017, during the presentation of the Chilean singer Mon Laferte, who was nicknamed "the woman who woke El Monstruo". She achieved one of the greatest ovations of Quinta Vergara for a Chilean artist living in another country, as well as causing chaos and booing towards the animators and the organization of the event, due to the denial of these to award her the Gaviota de Platino. This award recognizes the career of great artists; and only had been granted to the Mexican singer Luis Miguel in 2012 and to the Spanish singer Isabel Pantoja in the same version of the contest. Given the situation, the host of the festival Carolina de Moras commented in an interview: "She took a much bigger prize, she took the real ovation of La Quinta Vergara and the Platino can not pay that". The general director of the show, Alex Hernández, also commented, "At that moment I felt that El Monstruo was something wonderful, I found a wonderful television moment in which it was happening". Hernandez also explained the reason why it was decided not to deliver a second Gaviota de Oro to the artist to replace the Gaviota de Platino: "We did not deliver it simply because we did not wanted to set a precedent that later could cost us double Gaviotas with many artists".

Explanation of the phenomenon 

The possible reason for the existence of El Monstruo is over-dimensioned quality public festival to voice their catcalls heavily and for a long time. This is because the place and time of its completion, the Quinta Vergara Amphitheater (located on top of a small hill) and at night, provides a level of noise from the stands to the very large stage, even the whistling of a single person can be heard.

In addition, the gallery is very high in relation to the orchestra, which makes the audience look like a huge mountain of people from stage, simulating to be a semi-coliseum capable of holding 15,000 people in it.

List of ousted artists 
Some of the artists that the public of Viña del Mar International Song Festival has prevented from completing their stage show, but there are others that have been split by El Monstruo, that is, some people were booing and other cheering, and others amazingly have managed to silence them.

References 

Music festivals in Chile
Observation